Dorothy Karolyn Granger (November 21, 1911 – January 4, 1995) was an American actress best known for her roles in short subject comedies in Hollywood.

Career
Granger, with her parents, two brothers, Richard and James, and their grandmother, Clara ( Wilcox) Granger, moved to Los Angeles during the late 1920s.

Granger got her start in the entertainment industry when she won a beauty contest at the age of 13 at Silver Beach Summer Resort near Houston. Her budding figure and confident stage presence were perfect for studios that made comedy shorts. In 1930, her father took her to producer Hal Roach, who was then testing talent for his upcoming comedy series, The Boy Friends. 

Granger’s natural comedy timing got her the job immediately and she was placed under contract to Hal Roach Studios. She became a charter member of the two-reel-comedy community, appearing opposite many major comedians at Roach, Mack Sennett, Educational Pictures, Columbia Pictures, and RKO Radio Pictures. Among her famous credits are Hog Wild with Laurel & Hardy, The Dentist with W.C. Fields, Punch Drunks and Termites of 1938 with The Three Stooges. Granger also appeared with Andy Clyde, Charley Chase, Edgar Kennedy, Harry Langdon, Gus Schilling & Richard Lane, and Joe DeRita, as well as on live television with Abbott & Costello. Granger is best remembered as the sarcastic, suspicious wife in Leon Errol's series of two-reelers for RKO.

For her body of work in two-reelers, Granger was known as the "Queen of the Short Subject Films". However, she also appeared in about 100 feature films, including Frisco Jenny, Sunset in El Dorado, Kentucky Kernels, Dick Tracy vs. Cueball, Diamond Jim, and Show Boat.

Later years

Granger worked on a variety of television shows through the 1950s, including The Abbott and Costello Show, I Married Joan, Father Knows Best, Topper, Lassie, Death Valley Days and Wells Fargo. Her last television performance was a live show on Face The Facts in 1961. Granger left show business in 1963, calling it an “ulcer factory.”

Granger made her last public appearance in 1993 for the Screen Actors Guild’s 60th anniversary celebration. She was an honored guest at the celebration because she was one of SAG’s first members. In later years she helped her husband run an upholstery shop in Los Angeles.

She was the stepmother of film maker and former record producer Anthony J. Hilder.

Death
Granger died of cancer on January 4, 1995, aged 83, in Los Angeles, California.

Selected filmography

 Words and Music (1929) as Bit Part (uncredited)
 The Sophomore (1929) as Co-Ed (uncredited)
 Dance Hall (1929) as Dancer (uncredited)
 Hog Wild (1930, Short) as Tillie - The Hardys' Maid / Girl Lifting Her Skirt by Puddle (uncredited)
 The Laurel-Hardy Murder Case (1930, Short) as Young Relative (uncredited)
 Noche de duendes (1930) as La mujer furiosa (uncredited)
 Garde la bombe (1930)
 Primrose Path (1931) as Rita Johnson
 Behind Office Doors (1931) as Girl in Duneen's Apartment (uncredited)
 Goldie (1931) as Nanette, Girl in Cafe (uncredited)
 Politics (1931) as Newlywed (uncredited)
 Honeymoon Trio (1931, Short) as The Newlywed Wife
 The Tip-Off (1931) as Hatcheck Girl (uncredited)
 One Quiet Night (1931, Short)
 One Good Turn (1931, Short) as A Community Player (uncredited)
 Under Eighteen (1931) as Penthouse Party Guest (uncredited)
 Temptation's Workshop (1932) as Vi Rantler
 The Fighting Fool (1932) as Nina
 Keep Laughing (1932, Short)
 A Woman Commands (1932) as Party Girl (uncredited)
 The Beast of the City (1932) as Drunken Girl Singing at Party (uncredited)
 Night World (1932) as Bit (uncredited)
 Madison Square Garden (1932) as Vita-Life Rejuvenator Demonstrator (uncredited)
 Afraid to Talk (1932) as Kippie - Party Girl (uncredited)
 The Sign of the Cross (1932) (uncredited)
 The Dentist (1932, Short) as Miss Peppitone - Patient
 Frisco Jenny (1932) as Hortense, Pickpocket (uncredited)
 Back Street (1932)
 Second Hand Wife (1933) as Bit (uncredited)
 He Learned About Women (1933) as Minor Role (uncredited)
 He Couldn't Take It (1933) as Grace Clarice
 Love, Honor, and Oh Baby! (1933) as Mrs. Brown
 Only Yesterday (1933) as Sally (uncredited)
 Marriage on Approval (1933) as Hortense Bailey
 King for a Night (1933) as Dora
 Nana (1934) as Minor Role (uncredited)
 Hips, Hips, Hooray! (1934) as Miss Cole - Stenographer (uncredited)
 I'll Tell the World (1934) as Brown's Girlfriend - the Dancer
 Punch Drunks (1934, Short) as Girl
 The Merry Widow (1934) as Maxim's Girl (uncredited)
 Kentucky Kernels (1934) as Ethel - Baxter's Secretary (uncredited)
 Two Heads on a Pillow (1934)
 Marriage on Approval (1934)
 Vanessa: Her Love Story (1935) as Herries Servant (uncredited)
 I've Been Around (1935) as Girl
 Naughty Marietta (1935) as Minor Role (uncredited)
 Manhattan Butterfly (1935) as Nina Malone
 The Affair of Susan (1935) as Girl in Candy Shop (uncredited)
 Diamond Jim (1935) as Chorine (uncredited)
 The Ex-Mrs. Bradford (1936) as Fill-in Receptionist (uncredited)
 Show Boat (1936) as New Year's Eve Cutie (uncredited)
 Romeo and Juliet (1936) as Minor Role (uncredited)
 Camille (1936) as Raucous Party Girl (uncredited)
 The Road Back (1937) as French Girl (uncredited)
 Prescription for Romance (1937) as Cashier (uncredited)
 Termites of 1938 (1938, Short) as Mrs. Mabel Sturgeon (uncredited)
 The Shopworn Angel (1938) as Dancer (uncredited)
 Letter of Introduction (1938) as Woman at Barry's Party (uncredited)
 Dramatic School (1938) as Fat Girl
 The Family Next Door (1939) as Heavy Girl (uncredited)
 Blue Montana Skies (1939) as Mrs. Millie Potter
 When Tomorrow Comes (1939) as Waitress (uncredited)
 New Moon (1940) as Bridesmaid (uncredited)
 When the Daltons Rode (1940) as Nancy
 Back Street (1941) as Minor Role (uncredited)
 City of Missing Girls (1941) as Showgirl (uncredited)
 The Lady from Cheyenne (1941) as Myrtle (uncredited)
 Unfinished Business (1941) as Woman (uncredited)
 Honky Tonk (1941) as Pearl - Saloon Girl (uncredited)
 The Bugle Sounds (1942) as Woman with Cake (uncredited)
 North to the Klondike (1942) as Mayme Cassidy
 Pardon My Stripes (1942) as Peaches
 Take a Letter, Darling (1942) as Switchboard Operator (uncredited)
 In Old California (1942) as Girl in First Saloon (uncredited)
 Enemy Agents Meet Ellery Queen (1942) as Apartment Tenant (uncredited)
 The Old Homestead (1942) as Moll (uncredited)
 My Heart Belongs to Daddy (1942) as Yvonne (uncredited)
 Star Spangled Rhythm Officer (uncredited)
 USS VD: Ship of Shame (1942) as Bar Woman toasting 'Chicken' (uncredited)
 The Amazing Mrs. Holliday (1943) as Maid (uncredited)
 Hi'ya, Chum (1943) as Babe Fredericks (uncredited)
 Cowboy in Manhattan (1943) as Tommy
 A Lady Takes a Chance (1943) as Hot Dog Girl (uncredited)
 Fired Wife (1943) as Divorcee (uncredited)
 Sweet Rosie O'Grady (1943) as Flora - Singer (uncredited)
 Swingtime Johnny (1943) as Woman (uncredited)
 True to Life (1943) as Dance Extra (uncredited)
 The Woman of the Town (1943) as Belle
 Chip Off the Old Block (1944) as Cab Driver (uncredited)
 Lady in the Dark (1944) as Autograph Hunter (uncredited)
 Shine On, Harvest Moon (1944) as Mitzie Menegue (uncredited)
 Knickerbocker Holiday (1944) as Barmaid (uncredited)
 Her Primitive Man (1944) as Hatcheck Girl (uncredited)
 Johnny Doesn't Live Here Any More (1944) as Irene
 In Society (1944) as Hysterical Woman (uncredited)
 One Body Too Many (1944) as Mona Rutherford
 Practically Yours (1944) as Sponge Cake Lady (uncredited)
 Under Western Skies (1945) as Maybelle
 The Jade Mask (1945) as Stella Graham
 Here Come the Co-Eds (1945) as Woman in Ballroom (uncredited)
 On Stage Everybody (1945) as Marlow (uncredited)
 The Southerner (1945) as Party Girl (uncredited)
 Sunset in El Dorado (1945) as Maisie - Switchboard Operator
 Marshal of Laredo (1945) as Suzanne (uncredited)
 Girls of the Big House (1945) as Woman Clerk (uncredited)
 Adventure (1945) as Cashier (uncredited)
 The Runaround (1946) as Hotel Desk Clerk / Switchboard Operator (uncredited)
 Shadows Over Chinatown (1946) as Joan Mercer
 Black Angel (1946) as Woman by Phone Booth (uncredited)
 Two Years Before the Mast (1946) as Girl in the Golden Lion (uncredited)
 Dick Tracy vs. Cueball (1946) as Leeds (uncredited)
 That Brennan Girl (1946) as Party Guest (uncredited)
 The Devil Thumbs a Ride (1947) as Pearl (uncredited)
 Backlash (1947) as O'Neil's Secretary (uncredited)
 Killer Dill (1947) as Millie Gardner
 The Secret Life of Walter Mitty (1947) as Wrong Mrs. Follinsbee (uncredited)
 Louisiana (1947)
 Dangers of the Canadian Mounted (1948, Short) as Skagway Kate
 The Walls of Jericho (1948) as Gossip (uncredited)
 Michael O'Halloran (1948) as Ward Nurse
 The Strange Mrs. Crane (1948) as Jeanette Woods
 Sealed Verdict (1948) as Edna Brown (Red Cross date)
 The Paleface (1948) as Attendant at Bathhouse (uncredited)
 Variety Time (1948, Short) as Dorothy Errol (footage from 'Hired Husband') (archive footage)
 Miss Mink of 1949 (1949) as Mrs. Maureen O'Mulvaney
 Mighty Joe Young (1949) as Nightclub Patron (uncredited)
 Lonely Heart Bandits (1950) as Duchess Belle
 Westward the Women (1951) as Rejected Woman (uncredited)
 Footlight Varieties (1951, Short) as Vivian Errol (segment "He Forgot To Remember") (archive footage)
 One Minute to Zero (1952) as First Nurse (uncredited)
 So Big (1953) as Mabel (uncredited)
 New York Confidential (1955) as Lupo's Secretary (uncredited)
 The Desperadoes Are in Town (1956) as Molly, Saloon Girl
 Raintree County (1957) as Madame Gaubert (uncredited)
 Dondi'' (1961) as Woman in Grape Hat (uncredited) (final film role)

References

Further reading

External links

 
 
 

1911 births
1995 deaths
American film actresses
Deaths from cancer in California
Hal Roach Studios actors
20th-century American actresses
People from New London, Ohio